Poison Springs Battleground State Park is an Arkansas state park located southeast of Bluff City. It commemorates the Battle of Poison Spring in the American Civil War, which was part of the 1864 Camden Expedition, an element of a Union Army initiative to gain control of Shreveport, Louisiana and get a foothold in Texas.

In the battle, which was fought on April 18, 1864, Confederates and Choctaw Indians attacked and overcame a supply wagon of Union soldiers. The term "poison spring" arises from the apocryphal story that Confederate soldiers poisoned nearby springwater. The battle hastened the failure of the Camden expedition, and garnered notoriety for the slaughter of black Union soldiers from Kansas by the Confederate forces, which took no prisoners.

The site was listed on the National Register of Historic Places in 1969 as Poison Springs State Park, and, with other sites, is part of the Camden Expedition Sites National Historic Landmark. It was declared part of the National Historic Landmark in 1994.

Description and administrative history
Highway 76 was constructed along the historic road that was used by the Union supply train when it was roadblocked and attacked by the Confederate force during the battle. The improved portion of the park, with a picnic area and interpretive signs, is located on the north side of the highway.

The surrounding area is in roughly the same condition as it was at the time of the battle. The land that was then under cultivation has since been allowed to revert to forest.

The heavily wooded park features a small interpretive display and a shady trail. Sightings of deer and woodpeckers are common along the trail. The park provides an excellent example of the Gulf Coast forest region, consisting primarily of pine trees, but with some oak and with dogwood understory trees.

See also
List of Arkansas state parks
List of National Historic Landmarks in Arkansas
National Register of Historic Places listings in Ouachita County, Arkansas

References

External links

 Government
 
 General information
 Poison Springs Battleground State Park at Civil War Trust

1961 establishments in Arkansas
American Civil War on the National Register of Historic Places
Arkansas Heritage Trails System
Battlefields of the Trans-Mississippi Theater of the American Civil War
Camden Expedition Sites National Historic Landmark
Conflict sites on the National Register of Historic Places in Arkansas
National Register of Historic Places in Ouachita County, Arkansas
Parks in Ouachita County, Arkansas
Parks on the National Register of Historic Places in Arkansas
Protected areas established in 1961
State parks of Arkansas